Marcel Călin Lăzăreanu (born 21 March 1954) is a Romanian retired football player. He is the father of Filip Lăzăreanu, who is also a goalkeeper.

Club career 
Lăzăreanu started his career at Universitatea Cluj in 1978, but he played for the most part of his career at Bihor Oradea, becoming an important name in the history of this club.

He also played for Ilhwa Chuma in the South Korean K League between 1990 and 1991, being the first Romanian player and foreign goalkeeper in the K League.

He appeared in 29 matches and conceded 40 goals.

When he played in the K League, he was notable for his appearance like Yul Brynner and his lawyer licence.

Lawyer career 
He accepted a case - Cristian Dulca transfer fee embezzlement of FC Rapid București.

References

External links
 

1954 births
Living people
Sportspeople from Cluj-Napoca
Romanian footballers
Association football goalkeepers
Liga I players
Liga II players
FC Universitatea Cluj players
CFR Cluj players
FC Bihor Oradea players
FC UTA Arad players
K League 1 players
Seongnam FC players
Romanian expatriate footballers
Expatriate footballers in South Korea
Romanian expatriate sportspeople in South Korea
Romanian football managers
FC Universitatea Cluj managers